Mimema is a genus of plant rusts.
M. venturae has been reported as a parasite of Dalbergia miscolobium.

References

Pucciniales